Spoken Giants is the first global rights administration company for the owners and creators of spoken word copyrights.  Spoken Giants represents comedians, podcast authors, speech writers, and other spoken word creators.

Origin 

Spoken Giants was formed by 800 Pound Gorilla Records founders Ryan Bitzer and Damion Greiman, with former BMI executive Jim King who recognized the need for an organization to account for uncollected royalties for “spoken word” artists, including comedians, podcasters and public speakers.

Representation
Among the hundreds of performers Spoken Giants represents are Lewis Black, Dan Cummins, Gerry Dee, Pete Holmes, Kyle Kinane, Kathleen Madigan, the Ralphie May Estate, and Theo Von.  The company also added to its roster, the estates of Bob Hope and Desilu (Lucille Ball/Desi Arnaz) as well as Gabriel Iglesias, Larry the Cable Guy, Elayne Boosler, Jackie Fabulous, Eddie Pepitone, Nephew Tommy, Jeff Dye, Todd Barry, as well as Tom Segura, Tiffany Haddish, Jeff Foxworthy, Patton Oswalt.  Spoken Giants also represents works on record labels such as Comedy Central Records, Comedy Dynamics, Stand Up Records, Team Coco Records and others.

Rights Disputes

On Nov 24th, 2021, digital streaming provider Spotify removed thousands of comedy tracks including those of Robin Williams, John Mulaney, Mike Birbiglia, Jeff Foxworthy, and more in a response to collection of literary royalties on behalf of comedians. As of Dec. 7th, 2021 there was no agreement between Spoken Giants and Spotify and no word on the content being returned to the service.

References

External links
 Official site

Music licensing organizations